Erlinton (Roud 24) is #8 of the Child Ballads, the collection of 305 ballads from England and Scotland, and their American variants, collected by Francis James Child in the late nineteenth century. The collection was published as The English and Scottish Popular Ballads between 1882 and 1898 by Houghton Mifflin in ten volumes and later reissued in a five volume edition.

One variant features Robin Hood, but this variant forces the folk hero into a ballad structure where he does not fit naturally.

Synopsis
Erlinton imprisons his daughter in her bower, to keep her from sinning.  She persuades her sister to go to the woods with her, and escapes her with her lover Willie.  They are attacked, by knights or outlaws, but he fights and kills them all, and they escape.

In the Robin Hood variant, Robin sees a woman walking in the woods and persuades her to run away with him; unlike the other variants, they are not already lovers and she does not need to escape her father.  Her brothers attack, but Robin kills all of them except the youngest.

Commentary
This ballad has many similarities with Child ballad 7, Earl Brand, where the lovers' escape ends in their deaths, and the fight scenes often have details in common across variants.  Francis James Child only reluctantly separated them, but concluded that because the lovers' assailants are her kin in Earl Brand and strangers in Erlinton, they were separate types.

See also
List of the Child Ballads

References

Child Ballads
Robin Hood ballads